Idrettslaget Bølgen ("The Wave") is a Norwegian sports club from Bugøynes, Finnmark.

The men's football team played in the Third Division, the fourth tier of Norwegian football, from 1992 to 1995. Their best player was Ola Haldorsen.

The club currently does not field any football team.

Recent seasons
{| 
|valign="top" width=0%|

References

Defunct football clubs in Norway
Sport in Finnmark
Sør-Varanger
1946 establishments in Norway
Association football clubs established in 1946